William Hammell may refer to:
 William Henry Hammell (1845–1937), Canadian politician 
 William James Hammell (1881–1959), Canadian politician
 William A. Hammell, Chief of the Los Angeles Police Department (1904–1905)